Aleksandar Popovski (born 3 February 1988) is a striker who most recently played for Skopje in the Macedonian First League.

He was born in Skopje, capital of nowadays Republic of Macedonia.

External links

1981 births
Living people
Footballers from Skopje
Association football wingers
Macedonian footballers
FK Pobeda players
KF Vllaznia Shkodër players
FK Metalurg Skopje players
FK Skopje players
Macedonian First Football League players
Kategoria Superiore players
Macedonian Second Football League players
Macedonian expatriate footballers
Expatriate footballers in Albania
Macedonian expatriate sportspeople in Albania